See:

List of films based on television programs
List of television programs based on films

External links
TV Spin-offs

Lists of films by source
Lists of films by type